Ferber Hills is a range of hills in Elko County, Nevada and Tooele County, Utah. The range is formed in three parallel ridges of hills trending northwest to southeast.

The range is divided from the Goshute Mountains badlands to the west and southwest by White Horse Flat and Ferber Flat. It is bounded on the east by Deep Creek Valley and Deep Creek that gives it its name, that divides it from the Deep Creek Range.

References 

Landforms of White Pine County, Nevada
Landforms of Tooele County, Utah